Willie J. Perkins Sr. (born October 21, 1952) is an American politician who served as a member of the Mississippi House of Representatives from 1994 to 2019. He is a member of the Democratic party.

References

1952 births
Living people
Democratic Party members of the Mississippi House of Representatives
People from Leflore County, Mississippi
African-American state legislators in Mississippi
21st-century American politicians
21st-century African-American politicians
20th-century African-American people